O2 is the third studio album by Son of Dave. It was released in 2006 on Kartel Records. The album includes original songs as well as three covers of blues classics.

Track listing

External links
Review by Graham Reid
AllMusic review

2006 albums
Son of Dave albums